Burgl Heckmair (born 2 January 1976) is a German snowboarder. She competed in the women's giant slalom event at the 1998 Winter Olympics.

References

External links
 

1976 births
Living people
German female snowboarders
Olympic snowboarders of Germany
Snowboarders at the 1998 Winter Olympics
People from Miesbach (district)
Sportspeople from Upper Bavaria
20th-century German women